Bill J. Pace (February 14, 1932 – May 14, 1990) was an American football player and coach and college athletics administrator. He served as the head football coach at Vanderbilt University from 1967 to 1972, compiling a record of 22–38–3. Pace also served as the athletic director at Vanderbilt from January 1, 1971 until he resigned on January 15, 1973. Pace later served as an assistant coach with the New England Patriots in 1973. Beginning in 1974, Pace served as offensive coordinator under Vince Dooley at the University of Georgia installing the veer offense. Pace ended his coaching career as the assistant head coach and quarterbacks coach for Johnny Majors at the University of Tennessee in the 1980 and 1981.

Head coaching record

References

External links
 

1932 births
1990 deaths
American football quarterbacks
Arkansas Razorbacks football coaches
Georgia Bulldogs football coaches
Kansas Jayhawks football coaches
New England Patriots coaches
Tennessee Volunteers football coaches
Vanderbilt Commodores athletic directors
Vanderbilt Commodores football coaches
Wichita State Shockers football coaches
Wichita State Shockers football players
People from Ottawa County, Oklahoma